Carl Otto Ehrenfried Nicolai (9 June 1810 – 11 May 1849) was a German composer, conductor, and one of the founders of the Vienna Philharmonic. In addition to five operas, Nicolai composed lieder, works for orchestra, chorus, ensemble, and solo instruments.

Biography

Nicolai, a child prodigy, was born in Königsberg, Prussia. He received his first musical education from his father, Carl Ernst Daniel Nicolai, who was also a composer and musical director. During his childhood his parents divorced, and while still a youth, early in June 1826, Nicolai ran away from his parents' "loveless" home, taking refuge in Stargard with a senior legal official called August Adler who treated the musical prodigy like a son and, when Nikolai was seventeen, sent him to Berlin to study with Carl Friedrich Zelter.

After initial successes in Germany, including his first symphony (1831) and public concerts, he became musician to the Prussian embassy in Rome. When Verdi declined the libretto of Il proscritto by the proprietors of La Scala in Milan, it was offered instead to Nicolai.  Later, Nicolai refused a libretto by the same author, and it went to Verdi, whose Nabucco was his first early success. All of Nicolai's operas were originally written in Italian, the sole exception being his last and best known opera, The Merry Wives of Windsor, written in German. At one time he was even more popular in Italy than Verdi.

During the early 1840s, Nicolai established himself as a major figure in the concert life of Vienna. In 1844 he was offered the position, vacated by Felix Mendelssohn, of Kapellmeister at the Berlin Cathedral; but he did not reestablish himself in Berlin until the last year of his life.

On 11 May 1849, two months after the premiere of The Merry Wives of Windsor, and only two days after his appointment as Hofkapellmeister at the Berlin Staatsoper, he collapsed and died from a stroke. On the same day of his death, he was elected a member of the Royal Prussian Academy of Arts.

Nicolai was portrayed by Hans Nielsen in the 1940 film Falstaff in Vienna.

Works

Operas

Other
 Six four-part unaccompanied lieder, Op. 6
 Variazioni concertanti su motivi favoriti dell'opera La sonnambula di Bellini, Op. 26, for soprano, horn and piano (or cello or clarinet) (republished in 2000 by edition mf)
 Ecclesiastical Festival Overture on the chorale "Ein feste Burg ist unser Gott", Op. 31
 Pater noster, Op. 33, for two mixed choirs (SATB/SATB) a cappella with soloists (SATB/SATB). Published by Schott Music in 1999.
 Der dritte Psalm (Psalm 3) for alto solo. (Manuscript at Library of Congress.)
 Six sonatas for two horns: from the Handel Knot-Farquharson Cousins ms (re(?)published by Edition Kunzelmann in 1977.)
 Mass in D major (1832/1845). (Recorded on the label Koch Schwann in 1981, subsequently reissued on compact disc. Published by Augsburg : A. Böhm in 1986.)
 Te Deum (1832); Psalm 97, "Der Herr ist König"; Psalm 31, "Herr, auf Dich traue ich"; "Ehre sei Gott in der Höhe" (psalm and liturgical settings recorded also on Koch Schwann. Te Deum was also recorded on Deutsche Grammophon Gesellschaft LPM 39,170 in 1966.) Psalms 31 & 97 published by Bote & Bock of Berlin in 1977.
 Two symphonies: No. 0 (1831) and No. 1 in D (1835, rev. 1845)
 Concertino for Trumpet and Orchestra in Eb major (1835)

Songs and duets
Wenn sanft des Abends, Op. 2a
Der Schäfer im Mai / Männersinn, Op. 3
Abschied, Op. 13
Auf ewig dein, Op. 14
Wie der Tag mir schleicht / Willkommen du Gottes Sonne / Die Schwalbe, Op. 15
Lebewohl / An die Entfernte / Randino / Das treue Mädchen, Op. 16
Schlafendes Herzenssöhnchen, Op. 19
Rastlose Liebe, Op. 23
Il duolo d'amore / Se tranquillo a te d'accanto / Il desiderio al lido op. 24
Die Träne, Op. 30
Die Beruhigung / Der getreue Bub / Stürm, stürm, du Winterwind, Op. 34
Der Kuckuck / Flohjammer / Du bist zu klein, mein Hänselein, Op. 35
Herbstlied, Op. 37

Works for piano
Six danses brillantes
Rondo capriccioso
Sonata in d minor Op. 27
Mondwalzer
Etude Adieu à Liszt, Op. 28
3 Etudes, Op. 40

References
Notes

Sources

External links

 

Otto Nicolai biography and timeline at MusicWeb Classpedia

1810 births
1849 deaths
19th-century classical composers
19th-century conductors (music)
19th-century German composers
German conductors (music)
German male classical composers
German male conductors (music)
German opera composers
German Romantic composers
Male opera composers
Music directors of the Berlin State Opera
Musicians from Königsberg
People from East Prussia
Pupils of Bernhard Klein
Pupils of Carl Friedrich Zelter